Wirth Lake is in Theodore Wirth Park, a large park managed by the Minneapolis Park and Recreation Board, but is actually in Golden Valley, a neighboring suburb.

References 

Lakes of Hennepin County, Minnesota
Lakes of Minnesota